The 2022–23 Incarnate Word Cardinals men's basketball team represented the University of the Incarnate Word during the 2022–23 NCAA Division I men's basketball season. The Cardinals were led by fifth-year head coach Carson Cunningham and played their home games at McDermott Convocation Center in San Antonio, Texas as members of the Southland Conference.  The Cardinals finished the season 12–19, 6–12 in Southland play to finish in ninth place. They failed to qualify for the Southland tournament.

Previous season
The Cardinals finished the season 7–25, 3–11 in Southland play to finish in last place. They lost in the first round of the Southland tournament to Houston Baptist.

Preseason polls

Southland Conference Poll
The Southland Conference released its preseason poll on October 25, 2022. Receiving 36 votes overall, the Cardinals were picked to finish tenth in the conference.

Preseason All Conference
No Cardinals were selected to the Preseason all conference teams.

Roster

Schedule and results

|-
!colspan=9 style=| Non-conference Regular season

|-
!colspan=9 style=| Southland Conference Regular season

Source:

See also
2022–23 Incarnate Word Cardinals women's basketball team

References

Incarnate Word Cardinals men's basketball seasons
Incarnate Word
Incarnate Word Cardinals men's basketball
Incarnate Word Cardinals men's basketball